Franco Ariel Ferrari (born 9 May 1992) is an Argentine professional footballer who plays as a left-back for Cypriot First Division club APOEL.

Career
Ferrari began his career with Tiro Federal. He was selected on two occasions in 2010–11, including his professional debut against Ferro Carril Oeste on 11 June 2011. Ferrari scored seven goals across his following four seasons, in Torneo Argentino A/Torneo Federal A following 2011 relegation, with Tiro Federal, three of which arrived in separate fixtures against Libertad. Ferrari spent the 2015 Primera B Nacional campaign with Santamarina, making fifteen appearances under Gustavo Coleoni as the club finished fourth; losing in the promotion play-offs to Patronato. A short stint with Torneo Federal B's Puerto San Martín occurred in early 2016.

Ferrari spent the majority of 2016 with Mitre of Torneo Federal A. After one goal in forty-six encounters with Mitre, the defender was part of their promotion winning squad of 2016–17. In June 2019, ahead of 2019–20, Ferrari agreed a move to Greek football with Volos.

Career statistics
.

Honours

Individual
Super League Greece Team of the Year: 2020–21

References

External links

1992 births
Living people
Footballers from Rosario, Santa Fe
Argentine footballers
Association football defenders
Argentine expatriate footballers
Expatriate footballers in Greece
Argentine expatriate sportspeople in Greece
Primera Nacional players
Torneo Argentino A players
Torneo Federal A players
Tiro Federal footballers
Super League Greece players
Club y Biblioteca Ramón Santamarina footballers
Club Atlético Mitre footballers
Volos N.F.C. players